Ryan Joseph Borucki (born March 31, 1994) is an American professional baseball pitcher in the Chicago Cubs organization. He previously played in MLB for the Toronto Blue Jays and Seattle Mariners.

High school
Borucki attended Mundelein High School in his hometown of Mundelein, Illinois.

Professional career

Minor leagues
Borucki was selected by the Toronto Blue Jays in the 15th round of the 2012 Major League Baseball draft, and was assigned to the Rookie-level Gulf Coast League Blue Jays. Borucki pitched six innings in the GCL, posting a 1–0 record and a 3.00 ERA before undergoing Tommy John surgery, which caused him to miss the entire 2013 season. In 2014, he pitched for the Rookie Advanced Bluefield Blue Jays and the Short Season-A Vancouver Canadians, and earned a combined record of 3–2, a 2.37 ERA, and 52 strikeouts in 57 innings pitched. Borucki made only three appearances in the 2015 season, posting an 0–1 record, 3.18 ERA, and seven strikeouts in 5 innings pitched. He was assigned to the Advanced-A Dunedin Blue Jays to open the 2016 minor league season. Borucki struggled with Dunedin, posting a 14.40 ERA through six starts before being reassigned to the Class A Lansing Lugnuts. He fared much better with Lansing, making 20 starts and posting a 10–4 record, 2.41 ERA, and 107 strikeouts. The Blue Jays added Borucki to their 40-man roster after the season to protect him from the Rule 5 draft.

Borucki was assigned to Advanced-A Dunedin to begin the 2017 minor league season. After posting a 6–5 record, 3.58 ERA, and 109 strikeouts in 98 innings, he was promoted to the Double-A New Hampshire Fisher Cats. In seven starts with the Fisher Cats, Borucki went 2–3 with a 1.94 ERA and 42 strikeouts in 46. He made a single start with the Triple-A Buffalo Bisons before the season ended, going six scoreless innings. Borucki was named Toronto's Minor League Pitcher of the Year on October 5, 2017. He began the 2018 season with Buffalo, and through June 24, had posted a 6–5 record, 3.27 ERA, and 58 strikeouts in 77 innings pitched.

Toronto Blue Jays
On June 26, 2018, the Blue Jays recalled Borucki from Buffalo. He made his Major League debut that night at Minute Maid Park against the Astros, taking a loss after allowing two runs on six hits over six innings with three strikeouts. Borucki became the twelfth pitcher in franchise history to throw at least six innings and allow two or fewer runs in his debut, and the first to do so since Zach Stewart in 2011. Borucki made his first start at Rogers Centre on July 2 against the Detroit Tigers, allowing two runs over seven innings with eight strikeouts, which tied him with Roy Halladay for the second-most strikeouts for a Blue Jays' pitcher in a home debut. On July 14, Borucki was optioned to the minors. He was recalled again on July 24. On August 3, Borucki earned his first major league win when he threw eight innings and allowed one unearned run in Toronto's 7–2 victory against the Seattle Mariners. Borucki finished the 2018 season with a 4–6 record and a 3.87 ERA over seventeen starts, eleven of which were quality starts, the most of any American League rookie that year. On December 5, the Toronto chapter of the Baseball Writers' Association of America voted Borucki the Blue Jays' Rookie of the Year for 2018.

Borucki missed the first half of the 2019 season after suffering from elbow inflammation, which was later identified as a bone spur, during spring training. He made his season debut on July 22, allowing four runs (two earned) and striking out three over 4 innings in a loss to Cleveland. After making two starts, Borucki returned to the injured list on July 31. On August 9, it was announced that he underwent surgery to remove bone spurs from his left arm and would miss the remainder of the season.

As the COVID-19-shortened 2020 Major League season began in late July, Borucki failed to make the Blue Jays' 30-man Opening Day roster. He was beat out by rookie Anthony Kay for the final spot in the team's starting rotation. However, he was soon activated on July 27 and added to the team's bullpen. He made his season debut that night, pitching 1 scoreless innings and earning the win against the Washington Nationals. With the 2020 Toronto Blue Jays, Borucki appeared in 21 games, compiling a 1–1 record with 2.70 ERA and 21 strikeouts in 16.2 innings pitched.

On July 6, 2021, Borucki was placed on the 60-day injured list with a left forearm flexor strain. Borucki was activated off of the injured list on July 16.
On September 22, 2021, he "intentionally" hit Kevin Kiermaier of the Tampa Bay Rays on a pitch that made the benches clear. Borucki and pitching coach Pete Walker were ejected, and Borucki was suspended for three days. He appealed and his suspension was reduced to two games.

On March 22, 2022, Borucki signed a one-year, $825,000 contract with the Blue Jays, avoiding salary arbitration. He was designated for assignment on May 31.

Seattle Mariners
On June 4, 2022, Borucki was traded to the Seattle Mariners in exchange for minor leaguer Tyler Keenan. He elected free agency on November 10, 2022.

Chicago Cubs
On January 4, 2023, Borucki signed a minor league contract with the Chicago Cubs.

Personal life
Borucki's father, Raymond, was an infielder who signed with the Philadelphia Phillies as an undrafted free agent in 1979 but never advanced beyond Triple-A ball. Growing up in the Chicago suburb of Mundelein, Borucki was a fan of the Chicago White Sox as a child.

References

External links

 

1994 births
Living people
American people of Slavic descent
Baseball players from Illinois
Bluefield Blue Jays players
Buffalo Bisons (minor league) players
Dunedin Blue Jays players
Gulf Coast Blue Jays players
Lansing Lugnuts players
Major League Baseball pitchers
New Hampshire Fisher Cats players
People from Mundelein, Illinois
Seattle Mariners players
Toronto Blue Jays players
Vancouver Canadians players